Olivier Charroin (born 10 March 1982) is a French former professional tennis player. He competes on the ATP Challenger Tour and ITF Futures, mainly in doubles competition. He reached his highest ATP singles ranking, No. 523 on 23 June 2008, and his highest ATP doubles ranking, No. 84, on 21 May 2012.

Career finals

Doubles (10)

References

External links

1982 births
Living people
French male tennis players
21st-century French people